Bastilla proxima is a moth of the family Noctuidae first described by George Hampson in 1902. It is found in Africa, including South Africa and Zaire.

The larvae feed on Antidesma species.

References

External links
Holloway, J. D. & Miller, Scott E. (2003). "The composition, generic placement and host-plant relationships of the joviana-group in the Parallelia generic complex". Invertebrate Systematics. 17: 111–128.
Lepidoptera Types of the Royal Museum for Central Africa

Bastilla (moth)
Lepidoptera of the Democratic Republic of the Congo
Lepidoptera of Malawi
Lepidoptera of Zambia
Moths of Africa
Moths described in 1902